San Donato di Ninea is a town and comune in the province of Cosenza in the Calabria region of southern Italy.

In 1602 the Spanish King Philip III, invested it as a dukedom to the Sanseverino dynasty, founded by the Princes of Bisignano and Princes of Salerno..

Twin towns
 Montesano Salentino, Italy
 Fiorano Modenese, Italy

Cities and towns in Calabria